The 2016 Philippine Basketball Association (PBA) Commissioner's Cup Finals was the best-of-7 championship series of the 2016 PBA Commissioner's Cup and the conclusion of the conference's playoffs. The Rain or Shine Elasto Painters and the Alaska Aces competed for the 16th Commissioner's Cup championship and the 117th overall championship contested by the league.

This was the first championship series that does not involve any team owned by the San Miguel Corporation or the MVP Group of Companies since the 2000 All-Filipino Cup Finals, when the Alaska Milkmen won the championship series against the Purefoods TJ Hotdogs. Purefoods was still then owned by the Ayala Corporation when the finals series was held. This was also the first championship series since the 2004 Fiesta Conference when both the top two teams at the end of the eliminations did not advance to the Finals.

Background

Road to the finals

Head-to-head matchup

Series summary
*overtime

Game 1

Game 2

Game 3

Game 4

Game 5

Game 6

Rosters

{| class="toccolours" style="font-size: 95%; width: 100%;"
|-
! colspan="2" style="background-color: #; color: #; text-align: center;" | Alaska Aces 2016 PBA Commissioner's Cup roster
|- style="background-color:#; color: #; text-align: center;"
! Players !! Coaches
|-
| valign="top" |
{| class="sortable" style="background:transparent; margin:0px; width:100%;"
! Pos. !! # !! POB !! Name !! Height !! Weight !! !! College
|-

  also serves as Alaska's board governor.

{| class="toccolours" style="font-size: 95%; width: 100%;"
|-
! colspan="2" style="background-color: #; color: #; text-align: center;" | Rain or Shine Elasto Painters 2016 PBA Commissioner's Cup roster
|- style="background-color:#; color: #; text-align: center;"
! Players !! Coaches
|-
| valign="top" |
{| class="sortable" style="background:transparent; margin:0px; width:100%;"
! Pos. !! # !! POB !! Name !! Height !! Weight !! !! College
|-

  also serves as Rain or Shine's board governor.

Broadcast notes
The Commissioner's Cup Finals will be aired on TV5 with simulcast on Hyper (both in standard and high definition). TV5's radio arm, Radyo5 will provide the radio play-by-play coverage. Fox Sports Asia airs the games as well on a delayed basis.

Sports5 will also provide online livestreaming via their official YouTube account using the TV5 feed.

The Hyper/Cignal TV broadcast will provide English-language coverage of the Finals.

Additional Game 6 crew:
Trophy presentation: James Velazquez
Dugout celebration interviewer: Apple David

References

External links
PBA official website

2016
2015–16 PBA season
Alaska Aces (PBA) games
Rain or Shine Elasto Painters games
PBA Commissioner's Cup Finals